Victoria Mary Atkins (born 22 March 1976) is a British politician who has served as Financial Secretary to the Treasury since October 2022. A member of the Conservative Party, she was first elected as the Member of Parliament (MP) for Louth and Horncastle in Lincolnshire in 2015. Prior to her political career, she worked as a barrister specialising in the field of fraud.

Atkins is the daughter of long-time Conservative MP Robert Atkins. She was appointed Parliamentary Under-Secretary of State for Safeguarding at the Home Office in November 2017 by Prime Minister Theresa May. Following the formation of the first Johnson ministry in July 2019, she was retained in her post. On 16 September 2021, during the cabinet reshuffle, Atkins was appointed Minister of State for Prisons and Probation and Minister for Afghan Resettlement, overseeing Operation Warm Welcome before resigning from that position in 2022.

Early life and legal career
Victoria Mary Atkins was born on 22 March 1976 in London. She is the daughter of Sir Robert Atkins, a former Conservative MP and MEP and Lady Dulcie Atkins, a Conservative councillor. She was diagnosed with Type 1 diabetes at the age of three. Atkins was privately educated at the Arnold School, a co-educational independent school in Blackpool in Lancashire. Atkins read law at Corpus Christi College, Cambridge.

Atkins was called to the bar (Middle Temple) in 1998. She worked as a barrister in the field of fraud in London.

Political career
In November 2012, Atkins stood unsuccessfully in the first ever Police and Crime Commissioner elections for the Gloucestershire Constabulary area. Although she garnered the most first preference votes, she lost to former police superintendent Martin Surl (Independent) when second preferences were counted. She was also shortlisted for the safe seat of Salisbury in 2010. For the 2015 election, she was on the shortlist for the Tonbridge and Malling seat, along with Edward Argar, Chris Philp, and Tom Tugendhat. Tugendhat won the selection; Atkins and her other opponents were selected for seats elsewhere in time for the same election.

Parliamentary career
Atkins was selected over three others in July 2014 as the Conservative candidate for Louth and Horncastle, at a meeting (referred to as an "Open Primary" by the party) of around 200 local party members in Spilsby. It is a safe Conservative seat: all areas of it have been continuously held by the party since 1924. The retiring MP was Sir Peter Tapsell, who at that time was Father of the House of Commons, having served the area for nearly 50 years in addition to his previous Parliamentary service. Former Prime Minister John Major (who first entered the House of Commons at the same time as her father) supported her first parliamentary election campaign, and has known her "since she was born".

After becoming the MP for Louth and Horncastle at the 2015 general election, Atkins was appointed as a member of the Home Affairs Select Committee in July 2015.

Atkins was opposed to Brexit prior to the 2016 EU membership referendum but consistently voted in favour of a referendum being held. After the referendum, she voted in favour of triggering Article 50 in February 2017.
In the 2017 general election, she retained the seat with 63.9% of the votes and an increased majority.

In June 2017, Atkins was appointed as a Junior Minister. Following Priti Patel's resignation as International Development Secretary, she replaced Sarah Newton as Parliamentary Under Secretary of State for Vulnerability, Safeguarding and Countering Extremism in the Home Office.

In the House of Commons she has sat on the Draft Investigatory Powers Bill (Joint Committee) and the Home Affairs Committee.

In April 2018, Atkins said she did not know the number of police officers in the country during an 'awkward' interview with Nick Ferrari on the LBC radio station. Ferrari informed her that the number was 123,142. This followed the leak of a Home Office report that concluded cuts to police numbers had "likely contributed" to a rise in serious violent crime. The following month, she voluntarily recused herself from speaking on drug policy in relation to cannabis after it was reported that her husband's company, British Sugar, grows under permit a non‐psychoactive variety of cannabis which is used in children's epilepsy medicine.

In June 2019, Atkins vetoed the appointment of Niamh Eastwood, the director of Release, to the independent advisory NGO Advisory Council on the Misuse of Drugs (ACMD)'s council. She did so as Eastwood had previously been critical of the Home Office's drug policy on social media including criticising a letter by Atkins in which she opposed the introduction of drug consumption rooms. Eastwood had previously been approved by a Home Office advisory assessment panel. A subject access request by Eastwood revealed that ministers vetted social media profiles of appointments to public bodies including references to "Windrush", "the government", "Brexit", and "anything diversity-related". In October 2019, Professor Alex Stevens, a criminal justice expert, resigned from the ACMD over alleged "political vetting" of panel members by the government. Kit Malthouse, the Minister for Policing replaced Atkins as the minister responsible for the government's drug policy on 7 October.

In the 2019 general election, Atkins was re-elected for Louth and Horncastle with an increased majority, obtaining 72.7% of the vote from a turnout of 65.7%.

In September 2021, following the withdrawal of foreign defence forces from Afghanistan and takeover by the Taliban, Atkins became Minister of State for Prisons and Probation at the Ministry of Justice. Simultaneously Rachel Maclean was appointed Parliamentary Under Secretary of State (Minister for Safeguarding) at the Home Office to succeed her. Both ministers assumed cross-Government responsibility for the Afghan resettlement programme and Operation Warm Welcome.

On 6 July 2022, Atkins resigned as justice minister, citing concerns with party leadership.

Personal life
Atkins is married to Paul Kenward, the managing director of British Sugar. They have one son.

Notes

References

External links 

 

1976 births
Living people
Alumni of Corpus Christi College, Cambridge
British barristers
Members of the Middle Temple
Conservative Party (UK) MPs for English constituencies
Female interior ministers
Female members of the Parliament of the United Kingdom for English constituencies
People educated at Arnold School
UK MPs 2015–2017
UK MPs 2017–2019
UK MPs 2019–present
21st-century British women politicians
21st-century English women
21st-century English people